Bai Estelita Tumandan Bantilan (born Labnai Tumndan on October 17, 1940) is a Filipino textile weaver from the municipality of Malapatan, Sarangani. She is credited with creating "some of the biggest, most subtly beautiful mats to be seen anywhere in Southeast Asia." She was given the National Living Treasure Award by the Philippines through the National Commission for Culture and the Arts in 2016.

Bantilan opened a mat weaving center in Malapatan to preserve and promote the tradition of Blaan weaving.

References 

National Living Treasures of the Philippines
Filipino weavers
21st-century Filipino artists
20th-century Filipino artists
1940 births
People from Sarangani
21st-century women artists
20th-century women artists
Living people